Castor is an unincorporated community in the northwestern part of Filmore Township in Bollinger County, Missouri, United States. Castor is situated on the Castor River and is located approximately 16 miles west of Marble Hill.

Name
The community of Castor was named for the Castor River.  The Castor River was in turn named for the Greek word kastor, meaning beaver.  The name was given by the French who came to the Mine La Motte district.  The name was on account of the many beavers and their damns found along the river. Castor is located on the Castor River.

History
A post office was operated in Castor between 1870–1914.

References 

Unincorporated communities in Bollinger County, Missouri
Cape Girardeau–Jackson metropolitan area
Unincorporated communities in Missouri